Freeez were an English electronic music group, initially known as one of the UK's main jazz-funk bands of the early 1980s. Initiated by John Rocca, Freeez consisted of various musicians, originally with Rocca and others such as Andy Stennett (keyboards), Peter Maas (bass guitar) and Paul Morgan or Everton McCalla (drums). They had an international hit with "IOU", and a UK top 10 with "Southern Freeez".

Career
The jazz funk band Freeez started in the back streets of North London in 1978. Their first single, "Keep In Touch" (1979) was self funded and produced by John Rocca on his Pink Rhythm Record label (later signed to Calibre/Pye), and included guitarist Jean-Paul 'Bluey' Maunick, who went on to become the initiator of the musical band Incognito. Freeez is known for its UK top 10 song "Southern Freeez", from the album of the same name, also self funded and produced by John Rocca on his own Pink Rhythm Records label (and later signed to Beggars Banquet) which included guest vocals by Ingrid Mansfield Allman. In the UK, the band was then contracted with the recording company Beggars Banquet Records.

Freeez's last and biggest hit (a top 5 hit in many countries around the world) was the song "IOU", which was written and produced by Arthur Baker with lyric contributions and lead vocals by John Rocca and remixed by Jellybean Benitez and Baker. The song was also used for the 1980s breakdance movie Beat Street. It scored two weeks at number one in the Billboard Dance chart, and was number 2 in the UK Singles Chart during the summer of 1983. It was followed by other releases from the album such as "Pop Goes My Love" / "Scratch Goes My Dub", which scored the U.S. top 5. During 1987, a remix of "I.O.U." scored number 18 on the U.S. dance chart, plus number 23 in the UK Singles Chart.

Freeez reformed during 1984 without John Rocca, or any of the other original members, other than Peter Maas. With a new style and almost a new group altogether, Maas worked with Louis Smith who assumed the duties of keyboard player, co-writer and programmer with Billy Crichton as songwriter and guitarist. The new Freeez then recorded an album, Idle Vice (1985), at Studio number 2 at Abbey Road Studios in the same room where the Beatles made their recordings. "That Beats My Patience" was the first single from the album. Smith later became a session keyboard player and toured with the rock music band The Escape Club who had U.S. number one song "Wild, Wild West" and several other U.S. Top 10 successes. He also recorded as one half of Bass Kruncher with main guitarist John Holliday from The Escape Club.

Rocca and Stennett also recorded under other pseudonyms such Pictures and Pink Rhythm during 1985 and John Rocca went on to score two further solo number one Billboard Dance hits under his own name and the pseudonym of Midi Rain, along with several other US cult dance hits.

Later in 1993–94, Maas and Paul Morgan took the Freeez format again and reformed as the Dazzling Urbanites adding Poly Koutrouzas (vocals) and Max Rutherford (guitars) to the lineup. Despite extensive preparation and rehearsals in North London (Dukes Avenue, Muswell Hill), the original success was never achieved.

Late 2011 saw the first CD release of their 1980 debut album Southern Freeez. The CD came as a double 'expanded' two-disc set featuring 12-inch versions, remixes and rare demos as well as newly written inlay booklet featuring notes from John Rocca and Maas. Their second album Gonna Get You has also been reissued in the same way.

Discography

Albums

Singles

See also
 List of number-one dance hits (United States)
 List of artists who reached number one on the US Dance chart

References

External links
 

 
English dance music groups
British post-disco music groups
British freestyle music groups
English electronic music groups
English funk musical groups
Virgin Records artists
Beggars Banquet Records artists